Presentation National High School is an all-girls boarding school in Usunobun Street,  Ugbekun Quarters, Benin City, Edo State Nigeria. This boarding school was founded by  the Archbishop of Benin City, Archbishop Patrick Ebosele Ekpu, on November 21, 1989.

Presentation national high school is the best girls school (NTA), May 2, 2016.

The school aims to create an atmosphere supportive of learning and sharing irrespective of race or ethnicity. The school's motto is: "Potestas Ex Scientia" (Knowledge is power). It achieved 11th position in the 2006 West African Senior Secondary Certificate Exams.

References

External links
 

Education in Benin City
Secondary schools in Edo State
Educational institutions established in 1989
1989 establishments in Nigeria
Girls' schools in Nigeria